Laurențiu Lică (born 28 October 1975) is a retired Romanian football midfielder.

References

1975 births
Living people
Romanian footballers
FC Dinamo București players
ACF Gloria Bistrița players
DSV Leoben players
AFC Rocar București players
FC Torpedo Minsk players
CSM Unirea Alba Iulia players
Association football midfielders
Romanian expatriate footballers
Expatriate footballers in Austria
Romanian expatriate sportspeople in Austria
Expatriate footballers in Belarus
Romanian expatriate sportspeople in Belarus